The Claro River is a branch of the Tinguiririca River in the O'Higgins Region of Chile. The Claro River valley is an affluent community.

See also
List of rivers of Chile

References
 EVALUACION DE LOS RECURSOS HIDRICOS SUPERFICIALES EN LA CUENCA DEL RIO BIO BIO

Rivers of Chile
Rivers of O'Higgins Region